Mehdiabad (also Romanized as Mehdīābād and Mahdīābād; also known as Gerd Mehdīābād and Mihdiābād) is a village in Musaabad Rural District, in the Central District of Dehaqan County, Isfahan Province, Iran. At the 2006 census, its population was 104, in 31 families.

References 

Populated places in Dehaqan County